Isabella of France and Burgundy (1312 – April 1348) was the daughter of Philip V of France and Joan II, Countess of Burgundy.

Life 
When Isabella was only two years old, her mother was placed under house arrest because it was thought she was having love affairs. Joan was released the following year since Isabella's father, Philip refused to divorce her. Her aunt, Blanche of Burgundy had been imprisoned in the fortress of Château Gaillard in 1314 along with Isabella's other aunt, Margaret of Burgundy.

In 1316, her father became the King of France. The same year, her marriage with Guigues VIII of Viennois was contracted. In 1322, however, her young father died, which devastated the family. Although Isabella was still in grief, she was married in 1323, when she was just 11 years old.

Guigues was killed while besieging the Savoyard castle of Perrière in 1333. He left the Dauphiné to his brother Humbert II. He was buried in Saint-André in Grenoble.

In 1335, Isabella married John III, Lord of Faucogney. She was widowed a second a time as John died in 1345, this marriage was childless. Isabella herself died of the bubonic plague (Black Death) in April 1348.

Ancestors

Notes

References

1312 births
1348 deaths
House of Capet
French princesses
Dauphines of Viennois
14th-century French people 
14th-century French women
Daughters of kings